Kirundi, also known as Rundi,  is a Bantu language and the national language of Burundi. It is a dialect spoken in Rwanda and adjacent parts of Tanzania, the Democratic Republic of the Congo, Uganda, as well as in Kenya. Kirundi is mutually intelligible with Kinyarwanda, the national language of Rwanda, and the two form parts of the wider dialect continuum known as Rwanda-Rundi.

Kirundi is natively spoken by the Hutu, including Bakiga and other related ethnicities, as well as Tutsi, Twa and Hima among others have adopted the language. Neighbouring dialects of Kirundi are mutually intelligible with Ha, a language spoken in western Tanzania.

Kirundi is one of the languages where Meeussen's rule, a rule describing a certain pattern of tonal change in Bantu languages, is active.

In 2020, the Rundi Academy was established to help standardize and promote Kirundi.

Phonology

Consonants
Although the literature on Rundi agrees on 5 vowels, the number of consonants can vary anywhere from 19 to 26 consonants. The table below is compiled from a survey of academic acceptance of Rundi consonants.

Vowels
The table below gives the vowel sounds of Rundi.

All five vowels occur in long and short forms. The distinction is phonemic.

Tone
Rundi is a tonal language.  There are two essential tones in Rundi: high and low (or H and L).  Since Rundi has phonemic distinction on vowel length, when a long vowel changes from a low tone to a high tone it is marked as a rising tone.  When a long vowel changes from a high tone to a low tone, it is marked as a falling tone.

Rundi is often used in phonology to illustrate examples of Meeussen's rule  In addition, it has been proposed that tones can shift by a metrical or rhythmic structure.  Some authors have expanded these more complex features of the tonal system noting that such properties are highly unusual for a tone system.

Phonotactics
Syllable structure in Rundi is considered to be CV, that is having no clusters, no coda consonants, and no complex vowel nuclei.  It has been proposed that sequences that are CVV in the surface realization are actually CV in the underlying deep structure, with the consonant coalescing with the first vowel.

Consonant harmony
Rundi has been shown to have properties of consonant harmony particularly when it comes to sibilants. Meeussen described this harmony in his essay and it is investigated further by others.

Official use 
Kirundi was recognized an official language in Burundi by the 1962 Constitution of the Kingdom of Burundi. In accordance with the constitution, many Burundian government orders, especially those printed in the Bulletin Officiel du Burundi from 1962 to 1963, were written in both French and Kirundi. After the constitution was suspended in 1966, Kirundi remained a de facto official language in the county, though its use in government documents declined. In 1972 Kirundi was adopted as the official language of instruction in Burundian primary schools.

Notes

References 
 Broselow, E. & Niyondagara, A.  (1990) "Feature geometry of Kirundi palatalization". Studies in the Linguistic Sciences 20: 71-88.
 de Samie. (2009) Dictionnaire Francais-Kirundi. L'Harmattan.  Paris.
 Goldsmith, J. & Sabimana, F.  (1989) The Kirundi Verb.  Modèles en tonologie.  Editions du CNRS. Paris.
 Meeussen, A.E. (1959) Essai de grammaire Rundi. Annales du Musée Royal du Congo Belge, Série Sciences Humaines – Linguistique, vol. 24. Tervuren.
 Myers, S. (1987) Tone and the structure of words in Shona.  PhD dissertation, University of Massachusetts, Amherst. Garland Press. New York.
 Ntihirageza, J.  (1993)  Kirundi Palatization and Sibilant Harmony : Implications for Feature Geometry. Master thesis, Southern Illinois University, Carbondale, Illinois.
 Philippson, G. (2003) Tone reduction vs. metrical attraction in the evolution of Eastern Bantu tone systems. INALCO. Paris.
 Sagey, E.  (1986)  The Representation of Features and Relations in Non-Linear Phonology. Doctoral dissertation, MIT, Cambridge, Mass.
 
 
 Zorc, R. D. & Nibagwire, L.  (2007) Kinyarwanda and Kirundi Comparative Grammar. Dunwoody Press.  Hyattsville.

External links 

 Online Kirundi/English dictionary, revised
 Free English-Kirundi Dictionary
 Free Kirundi selfstudy course
 Free Kirundi grammar study book
 PanAfrican L10n page on Kirundi...
 Learning Kirundi (in Spanish)
 Online Kirundi/English dictionary
 USA Foreign Service Institute Kirundi basic course

Languages of Burundi
Languages of the Democratic Republic of the Congo
Languages of Tanzania
Languages of Uganda
Rwanda-Rundi languages